Ownby Stadium was a stadium in the University Park suburb of Dallas, Texas.  It was the home of the Southern Methodist University Mustang football team. In late 1998, the stadium was demolished to build Gerald J. Ford Stadium at the site.

Background
Named for Jordon Ownby, the stadium was built at the south end of the campus.  There was controversy at the time of the stadium's inception, as the school had spent the gift from Ownby on a stadium (per his wishes) rather than a full-sized library, which the school did not have at the time.

As the Mustangs rose to prominence in the 1930s, they began scheduling an increasing number of games at the much larger Cotton Bowl, and finally moved there on a permanent basis in 1948, while later moving to Texas Stadium. However, after massive rules violations resulted in the NCAA handing down the "death penalty" in 1987, SMU officials decided to move football games back to a heavily renovated Ownby Stadium.

From 1976 to 1979 the chief tenant at Ownby was the Dallas Tornado of the North American Soccer League.

The 23,783-seat stadium consisted of four grandstands, one on each side, with the west (home) side being larger than the rest.  In late 1998, the stadium was demolished to make way for Gerald J. Ford Stadium, which stands on the same site.

See also

National Register of Historic Places listings in Dallas County, Texas

References

o
American football venues in the Dallas–Fort Worth metroplex
Buildings and structures demolished in 1998
Defunct college football venues
Defunct soccer venues in the United States
SMU Mustangs football venues
Soccer venues in Texas
Sports venues in Dallas
North American Soccer League (1968–1984) stadiums
Former National Register of Historic Places in Texas